The Maroota Parish is a civil parish of the County of Cumberland.

The Parish is in the Hundred of Hardigne and The Hills Shire Council, 50km north west of Sydney and on the Nepean River.

See also
Maroota, New South Wales

References

Parishes of Cumberland County